Potamocypris mastigophora is a species of ostracod crustacean in the family Cyprididae, subfamily Cypridopsinae. It is known from Africa and the southern areas of the Palaearctic.

Description
The carapace of P. mastigophora is laterally compressed, with length ranging from 0.55 to 0.64 mm. The left valve bears wide anterior and posterior flanges. The second antennae carry swimming setae that extend beyond the tips of the terminal claws. The males are unknown, all known populations reproducing through parthenogenesis.

References

External links

Cyprididae
Crustaceans of South Africa
Freshwater crustaceans of Africa
Crustaceans described in 1910